Britheny Joassaint (born 29 December 1999) is a Haitian swimmer. She competed in the women's 50 metre backstroke event at the 2017 World Aquatics Championships.

References

1999 births
Living people
Haitian female swimmers
Place of birth missing (living people)
Female backstroke swimmers